Shapotou District (Xiao'erjing: شَاپُوَتِوْ ٿِيُوِ) is a district of Zhongwei, Ningxia, China, noted for the Tengger Desert, and bordering Inner Mongolia to the north and Gansu province to the west.

It is the site of the Shapotou Desert Experimental Research Station. The research station is located at the southern end of the dune sea on the banks of the Yellow River. Research at station includes dune stabilization using grasses and microbial mats. Regions stabilized in the 1950s are now used for fruit and vine crops.

Sand dune stabilization in the region is required to curtail burial of the trans-Asia Baotou–Lanzhou Railway.

Administrative divisions
In the present, Shapotou District, has 10 towns and 1 township.
10 towns
 Binhe
 Wenchang
 Dongyuan
 Rouyuan
 Zhenluo
 He
 Yongkang
 Changle
 Yingshuiqiao
 Xingren

1 township
 Xiangshan

External links
Tengger desert & Tonghu grassland

Deserts of China
County-level divisions of Ningxia
Dunes of China
Zhongwei